Mike Kernaghan (born 22 July 1955 in Wallasey, England) is a lawn bowls competitor for New Zealand.

Bowls career

World Championship
In 2016 he won a bronze medal with Shannon McIlroy at the World Bowls Championship in the Men's Pairs competition in Christchurch before winning a gold medal in the fours with Blake Signal, Mike Nagy and Ali Forsyth.

In 2020 he was selected for the 2020 World Outdoor Bowls Championship in Australia.

Commonwealth Games
He won a bronze medal in the men's singles at the 2002 Commonwealth Games. He also competed at the 1994 Commonwealth Games, and was a coach at the 1998 Commonwealth Games.

Asia Pacific
Kernaghan has won four medals at the Asia Pacific Bowls Championships, including double silver in the triples and fours at the 2019 Asia Pacific Bowls Championships in the Gold Coast, Queensland.

National
He won the 2001, 2002 and 2014/15 singles titles, the 2007 pairs title and 2013/14 fours title at the New Zealand National Bowls Championships when bowling for the Kaikorai Bowls Club.

References

Living people
1955 births
New Zealand male bowls players
Commonwealth Games bronze medallists for New Zealand
Bowls players at the 2002 Commonwealth Games
Bowls players at the 1994 Commonwealth Games
Bowls World Champions
Commonwealth Games medallists in lawn bowls
Medallists at the 2002 Commonwealth Games